= Spectrofon =

Electronic magazine for ZX Spectrum

- Frequency: Monthly
- Format: Electronic video game magazine
- Publisher: STEP Interactive
- Founded: 1993
- Final issue Number: 1997; 24
- Country: Russia
- Based in: Moscow
- Language: Russian

Spectrofon was an electronic magazine for ZX Spectrum produced in Russia by the developer group STEP Interactive from Moscow. The magazine appeared on a monthly basis, and 23 issues were published in total. The issues were stored on a (usually well-protected) FDD and included both text and program part. There were several "columns" which appeared almost in every issue (solutions, game announcements, cheat codes and memory pokes). Every issue had its own unique custom-written shell, with graphical and music effects. In every issue had as supplement 2-3 (usually not widely known) games or utilities in full versions.

The magazine was the first electronic magazine in Russian and became very popular. There were several attempts to produce similar electronic magazines, like Adventurer, Deja Vu, Speccy, ZX Format, and ZX Guide, but they did not enjoy the same popularity as Spectrofon.
